is the Japanese name for the Liancourt Rocks.

Takeshima may also refer to:

Places
 Takeshima (Kagoshima), an island in Kagoshima Prefecture, Japan
 Eten Island in Chuuk Atoll, known to the Japanese as Takeshima

People
 Hiroshi Takeshima, an enka singer
 Toshifumi Takeshima, an Akita Television announcer
, Japanese footballer
 Yumiko Takeshima, a Japanese designer and ballet dancer

Other uses
 5179 Takeshima, an asteroid

See also
 Dokdo (disambiguation), Korean name of the island

Japanese-language surnames